Greatest Hits is a greatest hits compilation album by Exposé, released on November 21, 1995. It contains all of their Top 40 pop hits (with the exception of "I Wish the Phone Would Ring"), two new songs ("I'll Say Good-Bye for the Two of Us" [from the film Free Willy 2: The Adventure Home] and a remake of Skeeter Davis's hit "End of the World"). In addition, the album includes remixes of three of their hits.

Track listing

Charts
Singles - Billboard (North America)

References

1995 greatest hits albums
Exposé (group) albums